Kavadar (Serbian Cyrillic: Кавадар) is a village in Šumadija and Western Serbia (Šumadija), in the municipality of Rekovac (Region of Levač), lying at , at the elevation of 215  m. According to the 2002 census, the village had 456 citizens.

External links
 Levac Online
 Article about Kavadar
 Pictures from Kavadar

Populated places in Pomoravlje District
Šumadija